Botic van de Zandschulp (born 4 October 1995) is a Dutch professional tennis player. Van de Zandschulp has a career high ranking of world No. 22 in singles by the Association of Tennis Professionals (ATP), achieved on 29 August 2022. He is the current Dutch No. 1 men's singles player. He also has a career high doubles ranking of world No. 111, achieved on 7 November 2022. Van de Zandschulp has won one ATP Challenger singles title in Hamburg and one ATP Challenger doubles title in Alphen.

Van de Zandschulp's breakthrough occurred at the 2021 US Open when he became the third qualifier in US Open history to reach the quarterfinals of the tournament, after defeating seeded Casper Ruud and Diego Schwartzman. He was also the third man to progress to the main draw of all four majors through qualifying in one year, the others being Elias Ymer in 2015 and Frank Dancevic in 2011. In 2022, Van de Zandschulp reached his maiden ATP Tour final at the Bavarian International Tennis Championships.

Professional career

2021: Major debut, US Open quarterfinal, top 100, Dutch No.1 
Van de Zandschulp qualified for the first time in the main singles draw of a Grand Slam tournament at the 2021 Australian Open, where he was defeated by fellow qualifier Carlos Alcaraz. As a result, he reached a career-high of No. 145 on 22 February 2021 and was the No. 1 Dutch tennis singles player for a brief period from 8 February 2021 until 22 March 2021.
He also qualified for the second major in 2021 and in his career at the 2021 French Open and reached the second round for his first Grand Slam win with a defeat over No. 19 seed Hubert Hurkacz.

On June 23, 2021, he was upgraded to the main draw at Wimbledon, for his third Major debut in a row in 2021, as a lucky loser following the late withdrawal of the 4th seed Dominic Thiem. He beat qualifier Grégoire Barrère in the first round and lost to 7th seed Matteo Berrettini in the second round. In July following Wimbledon, as the second seed, he reached the final at the 2021 Dutch Open in Amersfoort. He was defeated by his compatriot and top seed Tallon Griekspoor in the final. He became the No. 1 Dutch player again on 30 August 2021 at World No. 117 in the rankings.

Despite having only 5 ATP tour match wins before the US Open, Van de Zandschulp qualified for the last major of the year, thus becoming the only man to progress to the main draw of all four majors through qualifying that year. He reached the third round of a major for the first time, defeating world No. 11 and eight seed Casper Ruud. He next defeated Facundo Bagnis to reach the fourth round. There he defeated world No. 14 and eleventh seed Diego Schwartzman in five sets to reach his maiden major quarterfinals, where he lost to eventual champion Daniil Medvedev. He was the only player to take a set off of Medvedev in the tournament. He became only the third male qualifier in the history of the US Open (after Nicolas Escudé in 1999 and Gilles Müller in 2008) to reach the quarterfinals. He also became the first Dutch man to reach the quarterfinals of a major since Sjeng Schalken at the 2003 US Open and 2004 Wimbledon. As a result, he improved 55 spots in the singles rankings, entering the top 100 for the first time in his career at World No. 62 on 13 September 2021.

He made his debut at a Masters 1000 level at the 2021 Indian Wells Masters by qualifying as the top seed into the main draw. He lost to Marcos Giron in the first round in three sets.

At the 2021 St. Petersburg Open, Van de Zandschulp entered as a qualifier and beat Yoshihito Nishioka, Sebastian Korda, and for the biggest win in his career so far, world No.6 and top seed Andrey Rublev in the quarterfinals. He lost to Croatian Marin Čilić in the semifinals. At the 2021 Stockholm Open he reached the quarterfinals where he lost to second seed Félix Auger-Aliassime. He entered the top 60 at World No. 57 on 15 November 2021

2022: Wimbledon fourth round, maiden ATP single final & doubles title, top 25

Van de Zandschulp started his year by reaching the quarterfinals at the  Melbourne Summer Set by defeating Adrian Mannarino and 8th seed Mackenzie McDonald in straight sets.  He lost to Grigor Dimitrov in the quarterfinals despite having match points on serve in the third set.

He reached the third round at the 2022 Australian Open where he lost to World No. 2 Daniil Medvedev. As a result, he made his top 50 debut in the rankings on 31 January 2022.

Van de Zandschulp reached the third round in Indian Wells, where he beat Tennys Sandgren and scoring his second top 10 victory over world no. 9 Félix Auger-Aliassime in 3 sets. He lost to Miomir Kecmanović in the third round in straight sets. In Miami, he lost to Mikhail Kukushkin in the first round.

His next tournament was Marrakech, where he beat Hugo Dellien in 3 sets in the first round, and qualifier Vít Kopřiva in straight sets in the second round to make his fourth ATP Tour-level quarterfinal overall and second of 2022. He lost to Alex Molčan in the quarterfinals.
In Monte Carlo, he lost to Sebastian Korda in the first round. He reached the top 40 on 25 April 2022.

Van de Zandschulp reached the final in Munich, where, as the 8th seed, he beat Brandon Nakashima and Egor Gerasimov to reach a third ATP Tour-level quarterfinal in 2022. Next, he upset second seed Casper Ruud in straight sets to reach the semifinals, where he beat 7th seed Miomir Kecmanović in a nearly three-hour match to become the first Dutch male player to reach an ATP Tour-level singles final since Robin Haase at Gstaad in 2016. He was forced to retire in the final against Holger Rune due to chest pain.

He saved three match points at the Madrid Open to advance to the second round for the first time at this Masters against Pablo Carreno Busta. At the Italian Open he also reached the second round for the first time on his debut at this Masters, defeating Korda this time. As a result he reached the top 30 at World No. 29 on 16 May 2022.

Seeded for the first time at a Grand Slam at the 2022 French Open, he also reached the third round for the first time at this Major but lost to 13-time champion and childhood idol Rafael Nadal in their first time meeting.

Van de Zandschulp played his first grass tournament on home soil at s'Hertogenbosch, where, as the 6th seed, he lost to Emil Ruusuvuori in 3 sets. The following week at Queen's Club, he reached the first ATP 500 semifinal of his career by defeating qualifier Paul Jubb, Grigor Dimitrov and Alejandro Davidovich Fokina. He became the first Dutchman to advance to the semifinals since Sjeng Schalken and Raemon Sluiter in 2002.

He reached a career-high in the top 25 on 27 June 2022 at the start of the 2022 Wimbledon Championships. Seeded 21st he reached the fourth round where he lost to Rafael Nadal in straight sets.

At the 2022 Winston-Salem Open he reached his third tour-level semifinals of the season defeating 10th seed Benjamin Bonzi in straight sets with two tiebreaks.

In October, he reached second round of Astana Open, where he lost in straight sets to an eventual champion, Novak Djokovic.
At the European Open in Antwerp, he won his maiden title in doubles partnering Tallon Griekspoor.

2023
Van de Zandschulp started his 2023 season at the Maharashtra Open in Pune, India. Seeded second, he reached the semifinals where he lost to Benjamin Bonzi. Seeded 32nd at the Australian Open, he was defeated in the second round by compatriot Tallon Griekspoor.

In February, van de Zandschulp competed at the Rotterdam Open. He lost in the second round to sixth seed, world No. 11, and eventual champion, Daniil Medvedev. Seeded eighth at the Qatar ExxonMobil Open, he was eliminated in the second round by qualifier Alexandre Müller. However, in doubles, he and his partner, Constant Lestienne, reached the final and lost to Rohan Bopanna/Matthew Ebden. In Dubai, he beat sixth seed and world No. 14, Karen Khachanov, in the first round. He ended up losing in the quarterfinals to second seed, world No. 6, defending champion, and eventual finalist, Andrey Rublev. Seeded 28th at the BNP Paribas Open, he retired during his second-round match against Ilya Ivashka.

Singles performance timeline

Current through the 2023 ATP Tour.

ATP career finals

Singles: 1 (1 runner-up)

Doubles: 2 (1 title, 1 runner up)

ATP Challenger and ITF Futures finals

Singles: 19 (7–12)

Doubles: 20 (17–3)

Record against other players

Record against top 10 players
Van de Zandschulp's record against players who have been ranked in the top 10, with those who are active in boldface. Only ATP Tour main draw matches are considered:

Record against players ranked No. 11–20

Active players are in boldface. 

  Feliciano López 1–0
  Reilly Opelka 1–0
  Borna Ćorić 0–1
  Alex de Minaur 0–1
  Frances Tiafoe 0–1

*

Wins over top 10 players
He has a  record against players who were, at the time the match was played, ranked in the top 10.

*

Davis Cup

Participations (5–2)

   indicates the outcome of the Davis Cup match followed by the score, date, place of event, the zonal classification and its phase, and the court surface.

References

External links

 
 
 

1995 births
Living people
Dutch male tennis players
People from Wageningen
Sportspeople from Gelderland
People from Veenendaal
Sportspeople from Utrecht (province)